State Route 9 (SR 9) is a numbered state highway in Maine, running from the New Hampshire border at Berwick in the west to the Canada–US border with New Brunswick at Calais in the east.

Route description

State Route 9 is a meandering highway that works its way from New Hampshire to Canada. It frequently runs concurrent with other highways listed below and also frequently changes direction. For instance, in Kennebunk, State Route 9 travels in a westerly direction even though it is signed as eastbound. State Route 9 runs through most of Maine's major cities including Biddeford, Saco, South Portland, Portland, Augusta, and Bangor. 

Over the years, a number of improvements have been made by the Route 9 Committee, a partnership of local government officials and business interests in the Baileyville-Calais area.

The Airline
The leg from Bangor to Calais is often referred to as "The Airline" commonly thought to be due to its shorter route than the older U.S. 1. (Before the coming of air travel, the term airline often referred to such a shortcut.) Although anecdotes about unexploded ordnance deriving from bombers flying from the former Dow Air Force Base (now Bangor International Airport) using a number of towers and landmarks along "The Airline", in fact the term goes back to the early 1850s as a contrast to the shoreline route. The last section of "The Airline" was paved in 1973 in Crawford and many old sections of the road are visible to the side of the present roadway.  The "Whale's Back", a 2-mile stretch built atop an esker in Hancock County was one of the most notable features of the highway until it was rebuilt.

Future bypass of Brewer
There have been plans to extend I-395 connect it to SR 9 began as early as 2001. In February 2008, MaineDOT suggested five possible routes to extend I-395 to SR 9, with two in particular designated as "State's Choice" and "Holden's Choice". The state approved the "Holden's Choice" route, designated 2B-2. All three affected communities issued resolutions in 2014 opposing this route,.

The state went forward with the project — not as an I-395 extension — but as a  super two rerouting of SR 9. The design was finalized in 2021, with construction commencing in 2022 and completion expected in 2025. When completed, the existing segment of Route 9 through downtown Brewer will be redesignated as Route 9 Business.

Junction list

See also
New England Interstate Route 9

References

External links

 

009
Transportation in Washington County, Maine
Transportation in Penobscot County, Maine
Transportation in Kennebec County, Maine
Transportation in York County, Maine
Transportation in Cumberland County, Maine